Athlone Town Association Football Club is an Irish football club from Athlone who are playing in the League of Ireland. The club is the oldest in the League as it was founded in 1887. First elected to the League of Ireland in 1922, they play their home matches in Lissywollen their new stadium which opened in 2007. The club's colours are blue and black. Away kits vary from year to year although orange and black has been worn most recently.

History
Athlone first competed in the League of Ireland in the 1922–23 season finishing sixth. They were the first non-Dublin club in the Irish Free State to compete in the national Free State League. They competed in the league until 1928 and not again until the 1969–70 season.

Athlone Town won the FAI Cup, their first domestic success in 1924, beating Fordsons. Dinny Hannon scored the only goal of the game, as Athlone went through the whole competition without conceding a goal.

Hannon was one of five Athlone Town players chosen to represent the Irish Free State at the 1924 Paris Olympic Games. The other players were Tommy Muldoon, Frank Ghent, John Joe Dykes and Paddy O'Reilly.

The club finished second in the league in the 1974–75 season earning a place in the UEFA Cup, the first time they had ever qualified for European competition. Their first-round game was against Norwegian side Vålerenga who they beat. Athlone's second round tie was against Italian side AC Milan drawing 0–0 in the first leg at St. Mel's Park setting a record attendance of 9,000 before losing the second leg at the San Siro 3–0.

Athlone won their first league title in the 1980–81 season. They played KB in Europe the following season earning a draw in the first leg in Denmark and again at St. Mel's Park going out on the away goal rule.

In the 1981–82 season Athlone Town won the League Cup for the second time beating Shamrock Rovers. However they failed to retain their league title that year finishing 4th. Athlone Town were again crowned league champions in the 1982–83 season and qualifying for Europe and also retained the League Cup beating Dundalk. Their opponents in Europe on this occasion were Belgian outfit Raymond Goethals managed Standard Liège, losing 3–2 at home and 8–2 in Liège.

In 1985 six new clubs were elected to the league increasing the leagues participation to 22. As a result, the current two division (Premier and First) structure was adapted with Athlone Town in Premier Division. In 1987 the club finished last and were relegated to the First Division. Their stay there was short, finishing top of First Division the following season, gaining promotion to the Premier Division. The club remained in the top flight until the 1991–92 season, when they finished eleventh and were subsequently relegated to the First Division.

Athlone Town again gained promotion to the Premier Division in the 1993–94 season, finishing runners-up to Sligo Rovers that season. The club were once again relegated in 1996, narrowly missing out on promotion in 2001 by one point to Monaghan United.

Since 2001 Athlone have finished each season in the bottom half of the first division. In that time eight different managers have been appointed. In 2007 the club moved from St Mel's Park to a new stadium, which was opened on 9 March when the home side hosted Kilkenny City in the opening game of the season.

On 15 December 2008, the club held an emergency E.G.M. with supporters stating that they were in financial difficulties. Part finance had been raised and the club were hopeful of raising the rest that they needed, but stated that difficult times may be ahead. The club however is very thankful for all the funds received through the patron scheme with over 350 loyal fans contributing.

On 27 September 2013, Athlone clinched the First Division title with a 1–0 win over Waterford United.

In 2014, Athlone Town had a bad campaign in the Premier Division, finishing last in the championship, in the Leinster Senior Cup it was eliminated in the quarterfinals by St Patrick's Athletic, in the FAI Cup it was eliminated in the second round by Longford Town, and in the League Cup  lost to Longford Town again in the first round.

In September 2017 the FAI banned  goalkeeper Igors Labuts and midfielder Dragos Sfrijan for 12 months after a UEFA investigation found "clear and overwhelming betting evidence" of fixing of Athlone's 29 April match against Longford Town in the 2017 League of Ireland First Division. The Professional Footballers' Association of Ireland said the decision was based on "half-baked innuendo".

In 2018, a dispute over ownership of Athlone Town Stadium arose between the club and local businessman Declan Molloy.

In November 2020, Athlone Town lost 11-0 to Dundalk F.C. in the FAI Cup semi final, a new record for the biggest win from a team in the history of the competition

Youth teams; there are many youth team ranging from u13 boys to u17 womans team.

The club currently plays in the First Division.

European record

Overview

Matches

Honours
League of Ireland: 2
1980–81, 1982–83
FAI Cup: 1
1923–24
League of Ireland Cup: 3
 1979–80, 1981–82, 1982–83
LFA President's Cup: 1
 1983–84
Tyler Cup: 1
 1979
League of Ireland First Division: 2
1987–88, 2013
League of Ireland B Division: 2
 1968–69, 1983–84
FAI Junior Cup
 1934–35, 1937–38: 2
FAI Youth Cup
 1983–84: 1

Players

Coaching and Medical Staff

Former managers

 Billy Young (1969)
 Mick Dalton (1970)
 Amby Fogarty (1974–76)
 Trevor Hockey (1976)
 Tommy Carroll (1976–77)
 Seán Thomas (1977–79)
 Turlough O'Connor (1979–85)
 Padraig O'Connor (1987–89)
 Mick Leech (1990–91)
 Pat Devlin (1991–92)
 Michael O'Connor (1992–95)
 Tony Mannion (1995–96)
 Dermot Keely (1996)
 Terry Eviston (1996–97)
 Liam Buckley (1997–98)
 Jimmy Greene (1999–00)
 Liam Buckley (2000–02)
 Aaron Callaghan (2004)
 Stephen Kelly (2004–05)
 John Gill (2005)
 Michael O'Connor (2005–07)
 Dermot Lennon (2007–09)
 Brendan Place (2009–10)
 Mike Kerley (2011–12)
 Padraig Moran (2012)
 Roddy Collins (2012–13)
 Mick Cooke (2014)
 Keith Long (2014)
 Eddie Wallace (2014–15)
 Alan Mathews (2015–16)
 Colin Fortune (2016–17)
 Ricardo Monsanto (2017)
 Ricardo Cravo (2017)
 Roddy Collins (2017–18)
 Aaron Callaghan (2018)
 Terry Butler (2018–2019)
 Adrian Carberry (2019–2021)
 Paul Doolin (2021)
 Martin Russell (2022)

References

External links
Athlone Town A.F.C.

 
Association football clubs established in 1887
League of Ireland First Division clubs
Sport in Athlone
1887 establishments in Ireland
Former Leinster Senior League clubs
League of Ireland B Division clubs
Association football clubs in Leinster
Former Athletic Union League (Dublin) clubs
Fan-owned football clubs